Wake Up Call is an album by British bluesman John Mayall (also called a John Mayall & the Bluesbreakers album) with various special guest appearances by Buddy Guy, Mick Taylor, Mavis Staples and other musicians, released on 6 April 1993.

Track listing
All songs written by John Mayall, except where noted.

"Mail Order Mystics" (Chris Smither) - 4:40
"Maydell" (Johnny Neel, Warren Haynes) - 3:56
"I Could Cry" (Junior Wells) - 5:09
"Wake Up Call" (David Egan, David Love Lewis) - 4:12
"Loaded Dice" (Gary Nicholson, Wally Wilson) - 4:27
"Undercover Agent for the Blues" (Leanne & Tony Joe White) - 5:21
"Light the Fuse" - 4:14
"Anything I Can Say" (Brendan Croker) - 3:43
"Nature's Disappearing" - 4:52
"I'm a Sucker for Love" - 4:05
"Not at Home" - 4:07
"Ain't That Lovin' You Baby" (Jimmy Reed) - 4:12

Personnel 
The Bluesbreakers
John Mayall - lead vocals, piano, harp, guitar, flute, Hammond organ
Coco Montoya - lead and rhythm guitar
Rick Cortes - bass guitar
Joe Yuele - drums

Additional musicians
Buddy Guy - vocal and lead guitar on "I Could Cry"
Mavis Staples - vocal on "Wake Up Call"
Mick Taylor - lead guitar on "Wake Up Call" and "Not at Home"
Albert Collins - lead guitar on "Light the Fuse" and "I'm a Sucker for Love"
David Grissom - rhythm and lead guitar
Michael Bruno - percussion
Joe Sublett - saxophone
Darrell Leonard - trumpet
Maggie Mayall - backing vocals
Tom Canning - Hammond organ

Production
Neal Avron - Assistant Engineer
R.S. Field - Producer
John Gabrysiak - Executive Producer
Efren Herrera - Assistant Engineer
Ron Kaplan - Executive Producer
Stephen Marcussen - Mastering
Richard McLaurin - Photography
Dave McNair - Engineer and Producer

References

1993 albums
John Mayall albums